Pelican School District is a school district headquartered in Pelican, Alaska. It operates a single K-12 school.

In 1999 the school had 30 students. Beginning circa 1999 the Anchorage company Education Resources Inc. was scheduled to enter a contract with the district to provide management services. As of the 2017–2018 school year, the school had 8 students.

References

External links
 

Education in Unorganized Borough, Alaska
School districts in Alaska
Hoonah–Angoon Census Area, Alaska